Apathya yassujica, the Yassujian lizard, is a species of lizard endemic to Iran.

References

Apathya
Reptiles of Iran
Endemic fauna of Iran
Reptiles described in 2003
Taxa named by Göran Nilson
Taxa named by Nasrullah Rastegar Pouyani
Taxa named by Eskandar Rastegar Pouyani
Taxa named by Claes Andrén